Papuliscala superlata is a species of minute sea snail, a marine gastropod mollusk or micromollusk in the family Epitoniidae.

Distribution
This marine species is found around North Island, New Zealand.

References

External links
 Powell A W B, New Zealand Mollusca, William Collins Publishers Ltd, Auckland, New Zealand 1979 
 Finlay, H. J. (1930). Additions to the Recent fauna of New Zealand. No. 3. Transactions of the New Zealand Institute. 61: 222-247
 Brown L.G. & Neville B.D. (2015). Catalog of the recent taxa of the families Epitoniidae and Nystiellidae (Mollusca: Gastropoda) with a bibliography of the descriptive and systematic literature. Zootaxa. 3907(1): 1-188

Epitoniidae
Gastropods of New Zealand
Gastropods described in 1930